Paul Maximilien Landowski (1 June 1875 – 31 March 1961) was a French monument sculptor of Polish descent. His best-known work is Christ the Redeemer in Rio de Janeiro, Brazil.

Biography
Landowski was born in Paris, France, of a Polish refugee father of the January Uprising, and a French mother Julie Vieuxtemps, daughter of Henri Vieuxtemps. He studied at the Académie Julian, before graduating from the École nationale supérieure des Beaux-Arts, he won the Prix de Rome in 1900 with his statue of David, and went on to a fifty-five-year career. He produced over thirty five monuments in the city of Paris and twelve more in the surrounding area. Among those is the Art Deco figure of St. Genevieve on the 1928 Pont de la Tournelle. 

He also created Les Fantomes, the French Memorial to the Second Battle of the Marne which stands upon the Butte de Chalmont in Northern France, and the two major Monuments aux Morts in French North Africa, respectively known as Le Pavois in Algiers (hidden since 1978 in the Memorial to the Liberation of Algeria) and the monument à la victoire et à la paix in Casablanca (originally on today's Mohammed V Square, relocated to France in 1961 and re-erected in 1965 in Senlis). 
 
Landowski is widely known for the 1931 Christ the Redeemer statue in Rio de Janeiro, Brazil, a collaboration with civil engineer Heitor da Silva Costa and architect and sculptor Gheorghe Leonida. Some sources indicate Landowski designed Christ's head and hands, but it was Leonida who created the head when asked by Landowski.

He won a gold medal at the art competitions at the 1928 Summer Olympics for Sculpture, an event held from 1912 to 1952. From 1933 through 1937 he was Director of the French Academy in Rome. He also served as an art–juror with Florence Meyer Blumenthal in awarding the Prix Blumenthal, a grant given between 1919–1954 to young French painters, sculptors, decorators, engravers, writers and musicians.

Landowski was the father of artists: painter Nadine Landowski (1908–1943), agricultural engineer and Legion d’Honneur,fallen in the Debarquement de Provence (Jean Maximilian Landowski) (1911-1944),composer Marcel Landowski (1915–1999), and pianist and painter Françoise Landowski-Caillet (1917–2007). He died in Boulogne-Billancourt, a suburb of Paris, where a museum dedicated to his work has over 100 works on display.

Gallery

References

External links 

 Official web site
 Paul Landowski Collection at Google Cultural Institute
 
 Paul Landowski at Masters of 20th Century Figure Sculpture 

1875 births
1961 deaths
Prix Blumenthal
Christ the Redeemer (statue)
Artists from Paris
French architectural sculptors
Prix de Rome for sculpture
Olympic gold medalists in art competitions
French people of Polish descent
Members of the Académie des beaux-arts
Burials at Passy Cemetery
20th-century French sculptors
French male sculptors
Medalists at the 1928 Summer Olympics
Olympic competitors in art competitions